Wilmer Raynel Neal Velásquez (born April 28, 1972 in Tela) is a retired Honduran footballer who played as a forward. He was regarded as one of the greatest footballers in Honduran soccer for Olimpia, and by foremost as the nation's greatest striker ever alongside Carlos Pavón.

He is currently the all-time top goalscorer in the Honduran National Football League with 196 goals, and was the second player to reach 150 goals after Denilson Costa.

Club career
Nicknamed El Matador, Velásquez started his professional career with Olimpia and he would not play for any other Honduran team during his career. He made his debut on 1 November 1990 against Platense and scored his first goal on 23 January 1992 against city rivals Motagua. He did play for other teams though, with Concepción in Chile, Sport-Recife in Brazil and Atlas in Mexico but was not very successful with all of them.

In 2005, Velásquez was crowned one of the Top Goalscorers in the World by the International Federation of Football History and Statistics. He made 15 goals with both the Honduras national football team and his club, Olimpia, finishing second only behind Brazilian player Adriano Leite Ribeiro, who scored 18 goals.

He has won 12 titles of the Honduran League, all of them with Olimpia. In December 2008 he announced he would retire after the 2009 Clausura. He has scored 318 goals in competitive games, 258 of them for Olimpia.

International career
Velásquez made his debut for Honduras in an April 1997 UNCAF Nations Cup match against Panama in which he famously scored four goals. He has earned a total of 47 caps, scoring 35 goals.  He has represented his country in only 2 FIFA World Cup qualification matches and played at the 1997, 2005 and 2007 UNCAF Nations Cups 
as well as at the 1998, 2003 and 2005 CONCACAF Gold Cups.

His final international was a February 2007 UNCAF Nations Cup match against Nicaragua, in which he again scored four goals.

Career statistics

Club

International goals

Honours and awards

Club
CD Olimpia
Copa Interclubes UNCAF (2): 1999, 2000
Honduran Super Cup (1): 1996–97
Liga Profesional de Honduras (13): 1992–93, 1995–96, 1996–97, 1998–99, 2000–01 A, 2002–03 A, 2003–04 C, 2004–05 C, 2005–06 A, 2005–06 C, 2007–08 C, 2008–09 C, 2009–10 C
Honduran Cup (1): 1995

Individual
Copa Centroamericana Top Goalscorer (3): 1997, 2005, 2007
Top goalscorers in Liga Nacional de Honduras (4): 1997–98 A, 1997–98 C, 1999–00 A, 2007–08 C
All-time Top Scorer of Liga Nacional de Honduras: 196 goals
All-time Top Scorer of Club Deportivo Olimpia: 196 goals
 CONCACAF Gold Cup Best XI: 2005
 CONCACAF Gold Cup Top Goalscorer: 2005

Notes

References

External links
 

1972 births
Living people
People from Tela
Association football forwards
Honduran footballers
Honduras international footballers
1998 CONCACAF Gold Cup players
2003 CONCACAF Gold Cup players
2005 UNCAF Nations Cup players
2005 CONCACAF Gold Cup players
2007 UNCAF Nations Cup players
C.D. Olimpia players
Sport Club do Recife players
Deportes Concepción (Chile) footballers
Atlas F.C. footballers
Liga Nacional de Fútbol Profesional de Honduras players
Honduran expatriate footballers
Honduran expatriate sportspeople in Chile
Expatriate footballers in Mexico
Expatriate footballers in Brazil
Expatriate footballers in Chile
Central American Games gold medalists for Honduras
Central American Games medalists in football